Events in the year 1555 in Norway.

Incumbents
Monarch: Christian III

Events
 Inger Ottesdotter Rømer and her daughter Lucie Nilsdatter dies in a shipwrecking off the coast of Sunnmøre.

Deaths
Inger Ottesdotter Rømer, wealthy landowner, Lady of Austraat (born c. 1475).

See also

References